Goce Sedloski (born 10 April 1974) is a Macedonian professional football manager and former player. He is the current manager of Macedonian First League club Shkupi. 

He earned 100 caps for the Macedonia national team.

Club career

Sedloski started his professional career at Pobeda Prilep in 1994 and played two seasons for the club before leaving it for Hajduk Split from Croatia. After a season and half, he moved to English club Sheffield Wednesday and returned to Croatia after two half-seasons by signing with Dinamo Zagreb in January 1999. He played for Dinamo until June 2004 and moved then to Japanese club Vegalta Sendai, where he spent one half-season before returning to Dinamo in January 2005.

In July 2005, he signed with Turkish club Diyarbakirspor and spent one season with the club before leaving it for SV Mattersburg, where he signed a two-year contract. After leaving Mattersburg after 5 years in 2011, he finished his playing career.

He had the biggest success while playing for Dinamo Zagreb, winning the Croatian First League 3 times, the Croatian Cup 3 times and the Croatian Super Cup 2 times.

International career
Sedloski made his debut for the Macedonia national team in a March 1996 friendly match against Malta, earning a total of 100 caps and scoring 8 goals from then until 2010.

On 16 August 2006, Sedloski became the first player to score a goal in the Euro 2008 qualifying tournament, when Macedonia beat Estonia 1–0 in Tallinn. His final international was a May 2010 friendly against Azerbaijan.

Managerial career

Early career
Sedloski was assistant and interim coach for the Macedonian national team and also assistant coach at Austrian Bundesliga club SV Mattersburg.

Turnovo
In 2013 he became the new manager of Macedonian club Turnovo.

In his only season with the club he guided them to the UEFA Europa League second qualifying round eliminating Lithuanian club Sūduva Marijampolė in the first qualifying round and after they were eliminated by Croatian club Hajduk Split in the second qualifying round.

He also guided the club to a 2nd-place finish in the Macedonian First League.

Vardar
Sedloski coached Macedonian club FK Vardar, joining the club in 2015 and resigning in August 2017. With Vardar he won two league titles and one supercup.

Riga
Sedloski was the manager of Latvian club Riga from January to May 2018. While at Riga, in 9 matches Sedloski won 4 matches, drew 1 and lost 4.

Široki Brijeg
Sedloski was named new the manager of Bosnian Premier League club Široki Brijeg on 31 August 2018 where he currently still is the manager. His first league win as Široki Brijeg's manager came on 23 September 2018, a 2–0 home win against newly promoted FK Zvijezda 09.

In the 2018–19 season, Sedloski led Široki Brijeg all the way to the 2018–19 Bosnian Cup final, where the club lost to FK Sarajevo in the two legged cup final 3–1 on aggregate (Sarajevo won 3–0 in Sarajevo and Široki Brijeg won 1–0 in Široki Brijeg). In the league, Široki Brijeg qualified for the 2019–20 UEFA Europa League qualifying rounds by finishing on 3rd place.

On 23 July 2019, after a 0–1 home league loss against NK Čelik Zenica the day before, and after 2 consecutive UEFA Europa League losses against Kazakhstan Premier League club FC Kairat in the 2019–20 UEFA Europa League first qualifying round, Sedloski decided to resign from the manager position of Široki Brijeg.

Career statistics

Club

International

Managerial statistics

Honours

Player
Dinamo Zagreb 
Croatian First League: 1998–99, 1999–2000, 2002–03
Croatian Cup: 2000–01, 2001–02, 2003–04
Croatian Super Cup: 2002, 2003

Manager
Vardar 
Macedonian First League: 2015–16, 2016–17
Macedonian Supercup: 2015

Široki Brijeg
Bosnian Cup runner up: 2018–19

See also
 List of men's footballers with 100 or more international caps

References

External links
 
 Profile at Macedonian Football 
 
 
 

1974 births
Living people
People from Prilep Municipality
Association football central defenders
Macedonian footballers
North Macedonia international footballers
FIFA Century Club
FK Pobeda players
HNK Hajduk Split players
Sheffield Wednesday F.C. players
GNK Dinamo Zagreb players
Vegalta Sendai players
Diyarbakırspor footballers
SV Mattersburg players
Macedonian First Football League players
Croatian Football League players
Premier League players
J2 League players
Süper Lig players
Austrian Football Bundesliga players
Macedonian expatriate footballers
Expatriate footballers in Croatia
Macedonian expatriate sportspeople in Croatia
Expatriate footballers in England
Macedonian expatriate sportspeople in England
Expatriate footballers in Japan
Macedonian expatriate sportspeople in Japan
Expatriate footballers in Turkey
Macedonian expatriate sportspeople in Turkey
Expatriate footballers in Austria
Macedonian expatriate sportspeople in Austria
Macedonian football managers
North Macedonia national football team managers
FK Horizont Turnovo managers
FK Vardar managers
Riga FC managers
NK Široki Brijeg managers
Premier League of Bosnia and Herzegovina managers
Macedonian expatriate football managers
Expatriate footballers in Latvia
Macedonian expatriate sportspeople in Latvia
Expatriate footballers in Bosnia and Herzegovina
Macedonian expatriate sportspeople in Bosnia and Herzegovina
Croatian people of Macedonian descent
Naturalized citizens of Croatia